Ülensi (also, Ülensi küla), is a village in Viljandi Parish, Viljandi County, Estonia. Until the 2017 administrative reform of Estonian municipalities the village was located in Tarvastu Parish. It is approximately 4.4 km (2.7 miles) northwest of the town of Mustla and 40 km (25 miles) southeast of the town of Viljandi. The village has a population of 113 people as of 2012.

In 1998, the Lusika tourism farm in Ülensi won the President of Estonia's award in for the most beautiful home decoration.

References

External links
Maphill.com

Villages in Viljandi County